Kāl Qal‘ah is a village in Farah Province, in western Afghanistan.

References

Populated places in Farah Province